Stanfield is a city in Umatilla County, Oregon, United States. The population was 2,043 at the 2010 census. It is part of the Pendleton–Hermiston Micropolitan Statistical Area.

Geography

History
The location was originally named "Foster" for John R. Foster, of Portland, who was an associate of Allen & Lewis. The firm had interests in the Umatilla area and purchased 4,000 acres northeast of Echo. They established a large ranch there and a store and small community followed; they were all named for Foster. In 1882, the Oregon Railway & Navigation Company siding and stop was named "Fosters". A post office with the name of Foster was established in 1883; the name was changed to Stanfield in 1909 for Robert N. Stanfield Jr., who later became a U.S. senator from Oregon.

Demographics

2010 census
As of the census of 2010, there were 2,043 people, 682 households, and 513 families living in the city. The racial makeup of the city was 66.9% White, 0.1% African American, 1.6% Native American, 0.1% Asian, 27.2% from other races, and 4.1% from two or more races. Hispanic or Latino of any race were 35.9% of the population.

There were 682 households, of which 41.5% had children under the age of 18 living with them, 55.7% were married couples living together, 10.9% had a female householder with no husband present, 8.7% had a male householder with no wife present, and 24.8% were non-families. 18.6% of all households were made up of individuals, and 6.4% had someone living alone who was 65 years of age or older. The average household size was 3.00 and the average family size was 3.42.

The median age in the city was 31.8 years. 31.6% of residents were under the age of 18; 8.8% were between the ages of 18 and 24; 26.6% were from 25 to 44; 24.8% were from 45 to 64; and 8.3% were 65 years of age or older. The gender makeup of the city was 50.5% male and 49.5% female.

2000 census
As of the census of 2000, there were 1,979 people, 661 households, and 497 families living in the city. The population density was 1,372.0 people per square mile (530.6/km). There were 714 housing units at an average density of 495.0 per square mile (191.4/km). The racial makeup of the city was 68.12% White, 0.56% African American, 1.31% Native American, 0.30% Asian, 0.25% Pacific Islander, 25.82% from other races, and 3.64% from two or more races. Hispanic or Latino of any race were 31.03% of the population.

There were 661 households, out of which 38.9% had children under the age of 18 living with them, 59.5% were married couples living together, 8.5% had a female householder with no husband present, and 24.8% were non-families. 18.2% of all households were made up of individuals, and 7.7% had someone living alone who was 65 years of age or older. The average household size was 2.99 and the average family size was 3.40.

In the city, the population was spread out, with 32.1% under the age of 18, 10.7% from 18 to 24, 28.2% from 25 to 44, 20.0% from 45 to 64, and 9.0% who were 65 years of age or older. The median age was 29 years. For every 100 females, there were 106.8 males. For every 100 females age 18 and over, there were 109.0 males.

The median income for a household in the city was $35,286, and the median income for a family was $38,145. Males had a median income of $28,578 versus $18,841 for females. The per capita income for the city was $12,842. About 10.6% of families and 14.2% of the population were below the poverty line, including 20.4% of those under age 18 and 7.6% of those age 65 or over.

References

External links

 Entry for Stanfield in the Oregon Blue Book

Cities in Oregon
Cities in Umatilla County, Oregon
Pendleton–Hermiston Micropolitan Statistical Area
1909 establishments in Oregon
Populated places established in 1909